Neptunbrunnen is a fountain located in the Alter Botanischer Garten of Munich, Germany. It was sculpted in 1937 at the behest of the National Socialist government by Josef Wackerle. A muscular statue of neptune stands in the middle of the fountain, holding a trident on his shoulder, above a fish-tailed horse rising from the water.

Buildings and structures in Munich
Fountains in Germany
Horses in art
Maxvorstadt
Sculptures of men in Germany
Sculptures of Neptune
Statues in Germany